The White Angel or White Angel may refer to:

Film
The White Angel (1936 film), an American historical drama directed by William Dieterle
White Angel (1994 film), a British thriller directed by Chris Jones
The White Angel (2007 film), a Turkish drama, written and directed by Mahsun Kırmızıgül
The White Angel (1943 film), a 1943 Italian drama film
The White Angel (1955 film), a 1955 Italian film

Other uses
White Angel, a detail of the fresco in the Mileševa monastery, Serbia
Alfred Hayes (wrestler) (1928–2005), English professional wrestler, manager and commentator known as The White Angel
"White Angel" (song), a 2012 song by Japanese girl idol group Fairies
Wrightia antidysenterica, coral swirl, known as White Angel in the Philippines

See also
Josef Mengele (1911–1979), German SS officer and physician at Auschwitzm referred to as "der weiße Engel" ("the White Angel")
L'Ange Blanc (1930s–2006), masked wrestler in France during the 1950s and 60s
Ángel Blanco (1938–1986), Mexican professional wrestler
NK Zagreb, a Croatian football club whose fans are known as "Bijeli anđeli" ("White Angels")
White Angel, a car on the cover of the racing game Ridge Racer Revolution